A wardrobe is a cabinet used for storing clothes.

Wardrobe may also refer to:
 Wardrobe (clothing), a full set of multiple clothing items, particularly in the acting professions
 Wardrobe (government), part of royal administration in medieval England
 Wardrobe (museum), a military museum in Salisbury
 Wardrobe stylist, someone who picks out the clothing worn by celebrities, models or other public figures
 Wardrobe supervisor, in theatre, the person responsible for supervising all wardrobe related activities
 Royal Wardrobe, a building destroyed in the Great Fire of London of 1666
 Mick Wardrobe (born 1962), English association football player
 Papa Bouba Diop (born 1978), Senegalese football player nicknamed "The Wardrobe"
 Wardrobe, a character in Disney's 1991 animated film Beauty and the Beast
 The Wardrobe (video game), a 2017 video game

See also
 Cabinet (furniture)